The Man with the Golden Gun is a 1985 role-playing game adventure for James Bond 007 published by Victory Games.

Plot summary
The player characters must prevent a scientist from defecting to the Soviet Union.

Reception
Steve Crow reviewed The Man with the Golden Gun in Space Gamer No. 76. Crow commented that "All in all, The Man with the Golden Gun ranks up there in the top three of the eight 007 modules, along with Live and Let Die and Octopussy. It's best as a head-to-head adventure, with a skilled (very skilled) '00' agent. Interesting, well-developed characters and a plot set up to handle almost any contingency make playing a real pleasure."

References

James Bond 007 (role-playing game) adventures
Role-playing game supplements introduced in 1985